Pervomartovtsy (a compound term literally meaning those of March 1) were the Russian revolutionaries, members of Narodnaya Volya, planners and executors of the assassination of Alexander II of Russia (March 1, 1881) and the attempted assassination of Alexander III of Russia (March 1, 1887, also known as "The Second First of March").

March 1, 1881

The assassination in 1881 was planned by Narodnaya Volya's Executive Committee. Andrei Zhelyabov was the main organizer. After his arrest on February 27, he was replaced by Sophia Perovskaya.

Alexander II was killed on March 1, 1881 by a bomb, thrown by Ignacy Hryniewiecki. Hryniewiecki wounded himself fatally in the assassination; Nikolai Sablin committed suicide. Accomplices - Zhelyabov, Perovskaya, Nikolai Kibalchich, Hesya Helfman, Timofei Mikhailov, Nikolai Rysakov - were tried by the Special Tribunal of the Ruling Senate on March 26-29 and sentenced to death by hanging. On April 3, 1881 five Pervomartovtsy were hanged (except for Helfman, whose execution had been postponed due to her pregnancy. Her execution was later replaced with katorga for indefinite period of time; she nevertheless died of a post-natal complication in prison).

March 1, 1887
The second "First of March" was planned by members of the "terrorist faction" of Narodnaya Volya, including Aleksandr Ulyanov (brother of Vladimir Lenin). On March 1, 1887, they came to St. Petersburg's Nevsky Prospekt with bombs and waited for the carriage of Tsar Alexander III to pass by. However, they were arrested on the spot before his arrival. All of the 15 accomplices - Aleksandr Ulyanov, Petr Shevyrev (main organizers), Pakhomiy Andreyushkin, Vasili Generalov, Vasili Osipanov (bombthrowers) and ten other people - were tried by the Special Senate Committee on April 15–19 and sentenced. The first five were hanged on May 8, 1887; the rest were sentenced to prison, banishment, or katorga.

References
 Суд над цареубийцами. Дело 1-го марта 1881 года. Под редакцией В.В.Разбегаева. Изд. им. Н.И.Новикова. СПб том 1 и 2. 2014., 

Narodnaya Volya
Politics of the Russian Empire
Terrorism in the Russian Empire
Russian Empire regicides